
Gmina Irządze is a rural gmina (administrative district) in Zawiercie County, Silesian Voivodeship, in southern Poland.

Villages
Gmina Irządze contains the villages and settlements of Bodziejowice, Irządze, Mikołajewice, Sadowie, Wilgoszcza, Wilków, Witów, Woźniki, Wygiełzów, Zawada Pilicka and Zawadka.

Neighbouring gminas
Gmina Irządze is bordered by the gminas of Kroczyce, Lelów, Niegowa and Szczekociny.

References

Irzadze
Zawiercie County